The men's marathon competition of the athletics events at the 1979 Pan American Games finished at the Estadio Sixto Escobar. The defending Pan American Games champion was Rigoberto Mendoza of Cuba.

Records
Prior to this competition, the existing world and Pan American Games records were as follows:

Results

References

Athletics at the 1979 Pan American Games
1979
1979 Panamerican Games